Shannon Torrez (born 1970) is an American woman who became the center of media attention, when she was tried for the 2006 attempted murder of Stephenie Woods, and the kidnapping of newborn, Abby Woods in Washington County, Missouri. After attacking Woods and her son in their home, Torrez kidnapped her daughter, and attempted to convince friends and family that she had given birth to the child. After her arrest, Torrez continued to insinuate that the child was hers, despite DNA test results proving otherwise. Torrez plead not guilty by reason of insanity. She ultimately accepted a plea bargain, and received a 30-year sentence.

Early life
Shannon Torrez was born and raised in Vandiver, Missouri. Her parents worked in the area, as employees at a local Brickplant. Torrez attended school, grades K-8, in the neighboring city of Mexico, before her family relocated to St. Louis. Torrez graduated from Nerinx Hall in 1986, and later went on to attend nursing school at Western Illinois University in 1988. In her early years, Shannon was described by her mother as "a sweet girl, who loved animals and wanted to be a mother one day". Many childhood friends of Torrez had similar recollections of her. One woman who knew her in college even stated, that Shannon "just had to help people", and attributed Shannon's career as a nurse to her "gentle, loving personality".

Crime
On the morning of September 15, 2006, Stephenie Woods, recovering from a recent c-section, decided to take a nap and fell asleep on the couch, at her mobile home in Lonedell Acres, an unincorporated area 10 miles north of Potosi, Missouri. Her newborn daughter Abby was asleep in her crib, and her 1-year-old son, Conner, was in his playpen. A few minutes later, she was woken when Torrez knocked on her door, saying that her car had broken down nearby. Woods was very tired, but allowed Torrez to make a phone call and use her bathroom. When Woods glanced over to see Torrez emerging from the bathroom, she noticed that Torrez was no longer holding the phone, but now holding a large steak knife in one hand and a gun in the other. As Woods later on stated on Oxygen's crime documentary series Snapped, "you're caught off guard, as I was at that point. I was just looking for [the answers to] 'what do you want?', 'what can I help you with?'". Torrez then walked up to Stephenie and told her, "I'm here for your baby girl". A struggle immediately ensued, in which Woods was stabbed three times in the chest and back, and received defensive wounds to her hands; her left thumb nearly being severed. After overpowering Woods, Torrez tied her arms and legs to a kitchen chair and slashed her throat, severing her carotid artery. Stephenie, however was able to untie the ropes and grab a knife from her kitchen, but was strangled from behind until she passed out on the floor. Torrez then dragged Stephenie to the bathroom, and put her and Conner in the bathtub, locking the door behind them. She then took baby Abby, and escaped on Missouri Route 47. Stephenie awoke an hour later to Conner crying, and noticed that Abby was gone. Torrez had also taken the home phone, as well as Woods' cell phone. She was able to unlock the bathroom door and stumble out into the front yard with Conner in her arms. Miraculously, she survived after running three miles, barefoot, to the nearest house. Stephenie attributes her survival to instinct, as she stated on Snapped. She claimed, "I'm a mom. I mean, that's as simple as it is. I needed that other part of me which was her [Abby]". She was later air-lifted to the hospital.

Investigation
Police immediately questioned how the attacker had known that there was a baby girl in the house. Woods told police that she didn't know the woman's name, but had smoked marijuana with her at a mutual friend's house and had initially let her in because she recognized her face. Police then noticed a baby sign in the front yard, and linked this to the motive of the attack. Woods gave a description of the woman as a heavy-set, dark-haired Caucasian female with a baseball cap, but a lack of the perpetrator's DNA at the scene made it hard for detectives to find her. To help widen the search for baby Abby, police issued an AMBER alert, and asked Woods' mother to provide a photograph of the little girl. Baby Abby was born with a 'strawberry birthmark on her forehead', making her more identifiable in the search. In a desperate effort to find Abby, the baby's grandparents were also featured on a local newscast, in which her grandmother stated, "Please just bring her back! If you're the one who's done it, we don't have no issues with you, just bring her back"! Initially, the police were led to believe that Stephenie Woods had made the whole thing up, and was covering for someone, but that lead later died out.

Shannon Torrez lived just down the road from the Woods'. In September 2006, she was 36 years old and working part-time as a receptionist at a doctors office in Potosi, Missouri. Later that evening, her husband, Rodney Beck, returned home from work, to check on Shannon, who had claimed to have just delivered her own baby that day. In the spring of 2006, Shannon told her husband and her family that she was pregnant. On the morning of September 15, Torrez, began to feel what she thought were symptoms of false labor. Rather than calling a doctor, Shannon said she went about her day, and went out to the barn to feed her animals. By the time she came back from the barn, she described her labor pains were anything but false and said on Snapped, "I was going into full-fledged labor and didn't even really know it". She claimed to have gone back into the house and given birth to a baby girl, who she named Millie Mae. Three days after the attack, police found a pink Onesie in the forest near the Woods' home, leading investigators to believe that the baby had been murdered. While sitting down to tell the family of the news, Sheriff Gary Toelke received a phone call from a mysterious woman saying that the baby was alive.

Meanwhile, Shannon's sister-in-law, Dorothy, convinced her to go to the hospital, along with the baby, to make sure they were both okay. On Tuesday, Dorothy drove from St. Louis to Potosi, and automatically became suspicious when she noticed that the baby had makeup on her forehead. Aware of the Abby Woods case, Dorothy immediately called Shannon's husband and informed him of her suspicions. Rodney told her to take Shannon to the hospital and wipe the makeup off the baby's forehead while Shannon was in with the doctors. Dorothy did as she was told, and discovered a birthmark, identical to Abby's. When Shannon and Dorothy left the hospital, Dorothy confronted her. Shannon eventually admitted that the baby wasn't hers, but denied being Stephenie's attacker. She claimed she found the baby in a ditch along the roadside. Dorothy didn't believe Shannon's story, and called Shannon's sister and mother, after dropping her and the baby off at the house. The Torrez family formulated a plan, and later that afternoon, Shannon's husband and brother asked if they could hold the baby. Shannon agreed, and the two were able to escape and get Abby to Dorothy, who then gave her to the police. Stephenie and Abby were re-united at the a hospital in Washington, Missouri a few hours later. Shannon Torrez was arrested later that evening.

Police suspect that Shannon had suffered a miscarriage. She had been pregnant a few years earlier, and had witnessed the same fate. To spare the grief of telling her family that another child of hers had been stillborn, Shannon attacked Stephenie and kidnapped Abby to raise as her own. Despite the brutality of the attack, Shannon had no prior history of violence.

Trial
Shannon Torres originally plead not guilty to kidnapping, assault, burglary, and 8 other counts. In 2008, she went back to court to change her plea, stating that she didn't know what she was doing and questioned several times if the baby was hers or not. As she later stated on Snapped, "I could have tried to see what a jury would give me, or I could just take the evidence that was there and accept the fact that, even though I don't remember doing this, I obviously was involved in it". Stephenie Woods was able to positively identify her as her attacker, and in the end, Shannon received 30 years in prison.

Aftermath
Stephenie Woods has never returned to the home where the attack occurred. It has since been torn down, and a new trailer now occupies the original lot. Woods continues to reside in Potosi with her two children.

Rodney Beck filed for divorce against Shannon Torrez shortly after her initial arrest, and refused to visit her in jail or attend her subsequent trial. Beck accepted his former wife's guilt almost immediately, and issued a public apology to Woods and her family for his wife's actions in early 2007. Torrez and Beck's divorce was finalized on December 25, 2008, on the grounds that they never contact one another or their respective families in the future. Beck now resides in Illinois.

Shannon Torrez was initially housed at the Potosi Correctional Center in Mineral Point. However, concerns were raised due to her close proximity to the victims of her crimes. In 2010, she was moved to the Women's Eastern Reception, Diagnostic and Correctional Center (WERDCC) in Vandalia, Missouri. She will be 63 when she is eligible for parole in 2033.

References

1966 births
American people convicted of assault
American people convicted of kidnapping
Living people
People from Vandalia, Missouri
People from St. Louis County, Missouri
Western Illinois University alumni